Karslake is a surname, and may refer to:

 Edward Karslake (1820–1892), British Conservative Party politician
 John Burgess Karslake (1821–1881), English lawyer and politician
 John Karslake Karslake (died 1872), New Zealand politician 
 Paul Karslake (1958–2020), English artist